"Laser Love" is a song by English glam rock act T. Rex. It was released as a non-album single in 1976 by record label T. Rex Wax Co.

Release 

"Laser Love" was released as a single on 2 October 1976 by record label T. Rex Wax Co. Neither side of the single was ever released on an official LP during the band's lifetime, yet both have been included on deluxe CD reissues of Futuristic Dragon. The song was in the UK charts for a total of four weeks, peaking at No. 41.

References 

1976 singles
T. Rex (band) songs
Songs written by Marc Bolan
Song recordings produced by Marc Bolan
EMI Records singles
1976 songs